Saskatoon—Wanuskewin was a federal electoral district in Saskatchewan, Canada, that has been represented in the House of Commons of Canada since 1997. (In the Cree language: ᐋᐧᓇᐢᑫᐃᐧᐣ / wânaskêwin means, "being at peace with oneself".) It covers a part of the city of Saskatoon.

Geography
The riding includes the northwest quadrant of Saskatoon and extends north past Duck Lake, northwest past Lucky Man and west past Ruddell. The riding also includes the city of Martensville.

History
It was created in 1996 as "Wanuskewin" from Saskatoon—Clark's Crossing and portions of Kindersley—Lloydminster, Prince Albert—Churchill River and The Battlefords—Meadow Lake ridings.

In 2000, it was renamed "Saskatoon—Wanuskewin".

The electoral district was abolished in 2013 and now is contained within the bounds of Carlton Trail—Eagle Creek.

Members of Parliament

Election results

Saskatoon–Wanuskewin

Wanuskewin

See also
 List of Canadian federal electoral districts
 Past Canadian electoral districts

References

Notes

External links
 Riding history for Wanuskewin (1996–2000) from the Library of Parliament
 Riding history for Saskatoon—Wanuskewin (2000– ) from the Library of Parliament
 Expenditures - 2008
 Expenditures - 2004
 Expenditures - 2000
 Expenditures - 1997
 Map of Saskatoon—Wanuskewin riding archived by Elections Canada

Former federal electoral districts of Saskatchewan
Martensville
Politics of Saskatoon